Demarcation is the act of creating a boundary around a place or thing.

Demarcation may also refer to:
Demarcation line, a temporary border between the countries 
Demarcation problem, the question of which practices of doing science permit the resulting theories to lie within the boundaries of knowledge
Demarcation dispute, may arise when two different trade unions both claim the right to represent the same class or group of workers
Demarcation point, in telephony, the point at which the telephone company network ends and connects with the wiring at the customer premises
Demarcation transactions, starting and ending database transactions using begin, commit, and rollback methods